Heartplay is an album by guitarist Antonio Forcione and bassist Charlie Haden recorded in 2006 and released on the Naim label.

Reception
The Allmusic review by Jonathan Widran awarded the album 2½ stars, stating, "While well played and intricately performed, this type of date, focused more on craft than any sustainable energy, is best enjoyed by die-hard fans of the two artists".

Track listing
All compositions by Antonio Forcione except where noted.
 "Anna" - 3:58 
 "If..." - 2:57 
 "La Pasionaria" (Charlie Haden) - 8:21 
 "Snow" - 6:02 
 "Silence" (Haden) - 6:22 
 "Child's Song" (Fred Hersch) - 8:05 
 "Nocturne" - 2:38 
 "For Turiya" (Haden) - 11:13

Recorded at The Californian Institute of The Arts on June 26–28, 2006

Personnel
Antonio Forcione — guitar
Charlie Haden — bass

References 

Naim Records albums
Charlie Haden albums
2006 albums